Naharkatiya College is an institution for higher education in Naharkatiya, Assam. Naharkatiya College was established in 1964 at the initiative of the people of the locality. It is in a green and serene atmosphere free from the din and bustle of the town. The college is about three kilometres from Naharkatiya.

Affiliation & Accreditation
The college is affiliated to Dibrugarh University, recognised by the University Grants Commission under section 2 (f) & 12 (b) and accredited by the National Assessment & Accreditation Council (NAAC), Bangalore.

Education
Naharkatiya College caters to students pursuing the following qualifications.

HS Examination
Study for the Higher Secondary Examination is possible in the Arts and Commerce streams. This qualification is awarded upon successful completion of two years of study followed by relevant examinations.

Three Years Degree Course (TDC)
Bachelor of Arts and Bachelor of Commerce graduate degrees are offered. This degree is awarded upon successful completion of three years of study followed by relevant examinations.

Naharkatiya College has a study center of Krishna Kanta Handiqui State Open University (KKHSOU).

Information & Communication Technology Centre
The ICT Centre offers a certificate course in Computer Application for higher secondary and degree students

Women's Study Cell
The Women's Study cell has been functioning since September 2005. The cell has been established with the objectives of promoting awareness among women about their rights and strengths. The cell awards a cash prize of Rs. 1,000/- to the girl student securing highest aggregate marks in TDC final examination.

See also
 Naharkatiya

References

External links

Universities and colleges in Assam
Dibrugarh University
Educational institutions established in 1964
1964 establishments in Assam
Colleges affiliated to Dibrugarh University